The 2019 FIA World Rally Championship-2 was the seventh season of the World Rally Championship-2, an auto racing championship for rally cars that is recognised by the Fédération Internationale de l'Automobile as the second-highest tier of international rallying. The category was created when the Group R class of rally car was introduced in 2013 and runs in support of the World Rally Championship. The championship is open to cars complying with R5 regulations.

The 2019 season saw the creation of a new class within the championship, known as the World Rally Championship-2 Pro. The Pro class was open to manufacturer entries competing in cars built to R5 specifications, while the wider World Rally Championship-2 was open to privately entered cars.

Calendar

Entries
In accordance with the 2019 regulations, all crews in WRC-2 were required to register as independent entrants. Teams were still allowed to be present, but only to prepare the car for the driver.

Crew changes 
Daniel Barritt left the M-Sport World Rally Team to partner Toyota protégé Takamoto Katsuta.

Changes
The formation of the World Rally Championship-2 Pro class saw the introduction of changes to class eligibility. The Pro class will be open to manufacturer-supported entries, with teams permitted to enter two crews per event. Pro class entries must contest a minimum of eight rallies, including one outside Europe. Only the eight best results will contribute to the Pro class championship. Crews contesting the wider World Rally Championship-2 will not face any such restrictions.

The team's championship of the wider World Rally Championship-2 was discontinued. Entrants in the championship are now required to register under the name of the crew's driver.

Results and standings

Season summary

Scoring system
Points were awarded to the top ten classified finishers in each event.

Drivers' standings

Co-drivers' standings

Footnotes

References

External links
Official website of the World Rally Championship
Official website of the Fédération Internationale de l'Automobile

 
World Rally Championship-2